Palacio Legislativo (Legislative Palace in English), may refer to:

 Palacio Legislativo (Uruguay) in Montevideo, hosting the General Assembly of Uruguay
 Palacio Legislativo de San Lázaro in Mexico City, hosting the Congress of Mexico
 Palacio Legislativo Federal in Mexico City, a former legislative building now replaced by the Monumento a la Revolución
 Palacio Federal Legislativo in Caracas, hosting the National Assembly of Venezuela